Victor Torp Overgaard (born 30 July 1999) is a Danish professional footballer who plays as a midfielder for Eliteserien club Sarpsborg 08. He is a Danish youth international.

Career

Midtjylland
Torp started playing football in Lemvig, northwest Jutland, on the banks of the Limfjord when he joined Lemvig GF. Later he was scouted to the youth team of FC Midtjylland.

Fredericia (loans)
Shortly before his 19th birthday, Torp and his two teammates Sebastian Buch Jensen and Henry Uzochokwu were sent on loan to the second division club FC Fredericia.

On 29 July 2018, he made his senior debut when he was in the starting line-up in the 3–2 defeat at Næstved Boldklub, in which he scored a goal in the 37th minute for the temporary 2–1 lead. In the first half of the season, Torp, mostly used as a right midfielder, was utilised in every game, but in the training camp before the start of the second half of the season he suffered an abdominal injury and then fell out because of an inflammation in the lower part of the abdomen around the pubic bone.

His loan deal then expired and he returned to Midtjylland. However, Torp did not make a competitive appearance for Midtjylland. In January 2020, he was sent on loan again to Fredericia. After he had recovered, Torp played regularly and was used in all games.

Lyngby (loan)
After his loan expired, he returned to Midtjylland, but was then loaned out once again, this time to league rivals Lyngby Boldklub. Mostly playing as a central midfielder, Torp quickly became a starter for the relegation candidate. On 1 December 2020, he scored his first goal in the Danish Superliga in a 2–2 away draw against FC Copenhagen.

He suffered relegation to the Danish 1st Division with the club on 9 May 2021 after a loss to last placed AC Horsens, before returning to Midtjylland.

Kortrijk (loan)
On 31 August 2021, Torp was loaned out to Belgian First Division A club Kortrijk for the 2021–22 season.

Sarpsborg 08
On 8 June 2022, 22-year old Torp signed a three-year deal with Norwegian Eliteserien club Sarpsborg 08.

International career
Torp gained eight caps for the Denmark under-17 team in 2016, scoring one goal, and took part in the 2016 UEFA European Under-17 Championship in Azerbaijan at that age level. There, Denmark were eliminated after the group stage; Torp was utilised in all games. From 2016 to 2017 he played in five friendly matches for the under-18 team.

He was part of the Danish under-19 team from 2017 to 2018 and played 12 games in which he scored two goals. He also took part in the 2018 UEFA European Under-19 Championship qualification for the tournament in Finland, which Denmark missed out on. In 2018, Torp played two friendlies for the under-20 team.

On 14 November 2020 he received his first call-up for the Denmark U21 team, when he was selected for the squad for the 2021 European Under-21 Championship qualifier against Romania.

References

External links

1999 births
Living people
People from Lemvig
Danish men's footballers
Danish expatriate men's footballers
Denmark youth international footballers
Association football midfielders
Sportspeople from the Central Denmark Region
FC Midtjylland players
FC Fredericia players
Lyngby Boldklub players
K.V. Kortrijk players
Sarpsborg 08 FF players
Danish Superliga players
Danish 1st Division players
Danish expatriate sportspeople in Belgium
Danish expatriate sportspeople in Norway
Expatriate footballers in Belgium
Expatriate footballers in Norway